Alejandro Brian Barbaro (born 20 January 1992) is an Argentine footballer who plays as a right winger.

Club career
Born in Lomas de Zamora, Buenos Aires, Barbaro finished his formation with Banfield. He made his first team – and Primera División – debut on 18 February 2011, coming on as a second-half substitute for Diego de Souza in a 1–1 home draw against Colón.

Barbaro scored his first professional goal on 29 April 2011, netting his team's third in a 4–3 home loss against Quilmes. He would subsequently feature sparingly for the side during his spell, suffering relegation in 2012.

Barbaro joined All Boys in June 2013, after agreeing to a one-year deal. The following 24 June he left the side at the expiration of his contract, and signed an 18-month deal with San Lorenzo on 15 August 2014.

After being rarely used, Barbaro moved abroad for the first time in his career, joining Nacional in Uruguay after cutting ties with San Lorenzo. On 8 July 2016 he switched teams and countries again, after signing for Apollon Limassol.

Barbaro was loaned to fellow Cypriot First Division side Karmiotissa FC in January 2017, until June. On 11 September of that year, Barbaro joined the Russian Premier League club FC SKA-Khabarovsk. After playing only four games for SKA-Khabarovsk Barbaro was released by the club.

On 2 August 2019, Barbaro joined Aris Limassol FC in Cyprus.

Career statistics

Honours
Apollon Limassol
Cypriot Super Cup: 2016

References

External links

1992 births
People from Lomas de Zamora
Sportspeople from Buenos Aires Province
Living people
Argentine footballers
Argentina youth international footballers
Argentina under-20 international footballers
Association football wingers
Club Atlético Banfield footballers
All Boys footballers
San Lorenzo de Almagro footballers
Club Nacional de Football players
Apollon Limassol FC players
Karmiotissa FC players
FC SKA-Khabarovsk players
Independiente Medellín footballers
Aris Limassol FC players
Deportivo Pasto footballers
Once Caldas footballers
Argentine Primera División players
Primera Nacional players
Uruguayan Primera División players
Cypriot First Division players
Russian Premier League players
Categoría Primera A players
Argentine expatriate footballers
Expatriate footballers in Uruguay
Argentine expatriate sportspeople in Uruguay
Expatriate footballers in Cyprus
Argentine expatriate sportspeople in Cyprus
Expatriate footballers in Russia
Argentine expatriate sportspeople in Russia
Expatriate footballers in Colombia
Argentine expatriate sportspeople in Colombia